The Vietnamese Demilitarized Zone was a demilitarized zone established as a dividing line between North and South Vietnam from July 1954 to 1976 as a result of the First Indochina War.

During the Vietnam War (1955-1975) it became important as the battleground demarcation separating North and South Vietnam. The zone ceased to exist with the reunification of Vietnam on July 2, 1976, but the area remains dangerous because of the immense volume of unexploded ordnance that it contains.

Geography

Beginning in the west at the tripoint with Laos, it ran east in a straight line until reaching the village of Bo Ho Su on the Bến Hải River. The line then followed this river as it flowed in a broadly northeastwards direction out to the Gulf of Tonkin. Although it was nominally described as being at "the 17th parallel," the border never actually followed that line, only straddling the general area of that line of latitude.

History

The First Indochina War (also called the French Indochina War) was fought in French Indochina from 1946 to 1954 between France and the French-controlled State of Vietnam on the one side, and the communist-dominated independence movement the Viet Minh (aided by China and the Soviet Union) on the other. The Viet Minh won the war and gained effective control of all northern Vietnam except an enclave around Hanoi. On July 21, 1954, the Republic of France gave up its control of Vietnam, and the Democratic Republic of Vietnam was recognized as the government of northern Vietnam by France but recognized the State of Vietnam as the government of southern Vietnam at the same time.

The postcolonial conditions of Vietnam were set at the Geneva Conference of 1954, and an agreement was finalized on July 21, 1954. The agreement reflected the military situation on the ground: the northern part of Vietnam, which was almost entirely controlled by the Viet Minh, became the Democratic Republic of Vietnam, under the communist leader Ho Chi Minh. The southern part of Vietnam, where the Viet Minh controlled only relatively small and remote areas, became the independent State of Vietnam under Bảo Đại, the last scion of the old Vietnamese imperial house. The State of Vietnam later became the Republic of Vietnam. A temporary boundary, running primarily along the Bến Hải River was established pending elections, with the area on either side of the border declared a demilitarized zone. Troops of both governments were barred from that area.

After war between North and South Vietnam broke out in 1950s, the DMZ hardened into a de facto international boundary. The war itself evolved into a proxy conflict of the Cold War and thousands of American troops being sent to the country. Despite the DMZ's supposed status, 3rd Marine Division intelligence estimated that the combat strength of North Vietnamese Army and Viet Cong forces in the DMZ area in January 1968 was 40,943 troops.

The north was ultimately victorious in the war in 1975, and the DMZ ceased to exist after the reunification of Vietnam on 2 July 1976.

Tourism
Exploring the Demilitarized Zone can today be comfortably achieved by joining one of various tours starting daily from Huế or Đà Nẵng. Together with a local guide the most famous war settings, such as Khe Sanh Combat Base, The Rockpile, Ho Chi Minh Trail, Doc-Mieu-Station or the Vinh Moc tunnels, are visited on a full-day trip.

Although the Vietnam War ended decades ago, walking outside marked tracks can still be dangerous because of numerous unexploded ordnance devices.

Gallery

See also

 1st Searchlight Battery (United States)
Clear Path International - an American NGO assisting victims of bombs and landmines left over from the Vietnam War in Central Vietnam
Demilitarized zone
Hien Luong Bridge
Korean Demilitarized Zone
McNamara Line
Inner German border and Berlin Wall

References

External links

Archive.org: Blurry Travel Guide to the DMZ — with photos.
Honan.ne: Photos of DMZ
Washington Post map of the DMZ

North Vietnam
South Vietnam
Borders of Vietnam
International borders
Demilitarized zones
North Central Coast
Quảng Bình province
Quảng Trị province
First Indochina War
Vietnam War sites
1950s in Vietnam
1960s in Vietnam
1970s in Vietnam
1954 establishments in Vietnam
1975 disestablishments in Vietnam
Regions of Vietnam